The Imperial Household administration or office, may refer to:

 Imperial Household Department of Qing Dynasty China
 Ministry of the Imperial Household of Japan prior to 1889
 Imperial Household Agency of Japan after 1889
 Imperial Household Council of Japan after World War II

See also
 
 imperial household